John F. Betz and Sons Brewery was a beer brewery in Philadelphia, founded in 1775 as the Robert Hare & J. Warren Peter Brewery, it closed in 1939.  The brewery was located at 415 Callowhill, 5th & Lawrence Streets, Philadelphia, PA.

The person, John F. Betz can refer to John F. Betz (Sr.), John F. Betz (Jr.), or John F. Betz III.  John F. Betz Sr. gave his grandson John F. Betz III a brewery, named the Germania Brewery in Philadelphia, as a Christmas gift in 1907.
John F. Betz Sr. was the brother-in-law of D.G. Yuengling, Jr., the founder of D.G. Yuengling & Sons Brewery.

Betz also started a brewery in Jersey City, New Jersey with Henry Lembeck named The Lembeck and Betz Eagle Brewing Company.

Products 
John F. Betz Brewery produced the following brands. 
 Betz India Pale Ale  1933 - 1935
 India Pale Ale  1933 - 1935
 Betz Porter  1933 - 1939
 Betz Bock  1933 - 1939
 Betz Pilsener Beer  1933 - 1939
 Five Star Ale  1933 - 1939
 Old Stock Lager Beer  1933 - 1939
 Old German Beer  1934 - 1937

See also
 List of defunct breweries in the United States

References 

Beer brewing companies based in Pennsylvania
Defunct brewery companies of the United States